The 2019–20 season was K.R.C. Genk's 32nd season in existence and the club's 25th consecutive season in the top flight of Belgium football. It covered a period from 1 July 2019 to 30 June 2020. Genk competed in the Belgian First Division A, the Belgian Cup and the UEFA Champions League.

Players

Current squad

Out on loan

Pre-season and friendlies

Competitions

Overview

Belgian First Division A

League table

Results summary

Results by round

Matches
On 2 April 2020, the Jupiler Pro League's board of directors proposed to cancel the season due to the COVID-19 pandemic. The General Assembly accepted the proposal on 15 May, and officially ended the 2019–20 season.

Belgian Cup

Belgian Super Cup

UEFA Champions League

Group stage

Statistics

Squad appearances and goals
Last updated on 7 March 2020.

|-
! colspan=14 style=background:#dcdcdc; text-align:center|Goalkeepers

|-
! colspan=14 style=background:#dcdcdc; text-align:center|Defenders

|-
! colspan=14 style=background:#dcdcdc; text-align:center|Midfielders

|-
! colspan=14 style=background:#dcdcdc; text-align:center|Forwards

|-
! colspan=14 style=background:#dcdcdc; text-align:center|Players who have made an appearance this season but have left the club

|}

References

External links

K.R.C. Genk seasons
K.R.C. Genk
2019–20 UEFA Champions League participants seasons